The women's 100 metres hurdles event at the 1982 Commonwealth Games was held on 7 and 8 October at the QE II Stadium in Brisbane, Australia.

Medalists

Results

Heats
Qualification: First 4 in each heat (Q) and the next 1 fastest (q) qualify for the final.

Wind:Heat 1: +1.6 m/s, Heat 2: +1.1 m/s

Final
Wind: +4.5 m/s

References

Heats results (The Sydney Morning Herald)
Heats results (The Canberra Times)
Final results (The Canberra Times)
Australian results 

Athletics at the 1982 Commonwealth Games
1982